Jean-Michel Daoust (born November 24, 1983) is a Canadian professional ice hockey player. He is currently playing for the Kassel Huskies of the German DEL2.

Playing career
Undrafted from the Quebec Major Junior Hockey League, Daoust first played professionally for the Cincinnati Cyclones in 2006.

On January 18, 2008, Daoust signed a professional tryout contract with the Wilkes-Barre/Scranton Penguins. At the time, he ranked 1st in the ECHL in points (51) before signing with Wilkes-Barre/Scranton. He would finish the season with 18 points in 37 games.

On July 18, 2008, the Penguins exercised their option to re-sign Daoust. Daoust then moved to the Houston Aeros for the 2009–10 season, before signing a one-year contract with NHL affiliate, the Minnesota Wild, to remain in Houston the following year.

On June 9, 2011, Daoust signed with European DEL team, the Straubing Tigers on a one-year deal.

Career statistics

Awards

References

External links
 
 

1983 births
Canadian ice hockey right wingers
Cincinnati Cyclones (ECHL) players
Danbury Trashers players
French Quebecers
Gatineau Olympiques players
Graz 99ers players
Houston Aeros (1994–2013) players
Hull Olympiques players
Kassel Huskies players
Living people
McGill University alumni
Sportspeople from Salaberry-de-Valleyfield
Rockford IceHogs (AHL) players
Wilkes-Barre/Scranton Penguins players
Stavanger Oilers players
Straubing Tigers players
Canadian expatriate ice hockey players in Austria
Canadian expatriate ice hockey players in Norway
Canadian expatriate ice hockey players in Germany